Following is the list of historical novels which are set up on the history of India. This includes the history of the Indian subcontinent, which comprises present-day India, Pakistan and Bangladesh.

List

See also
 Historical fiction
 Narrative history
 Historical Romance
 Historical fantasy
 List of historical novels

References

Historical,Indian
Historical novels
 
Historical novels